April 1 Vidudala is a 1991 Indian Telugu-language comedy drama film written and directed by Vamsy. An adaptation of the novel Harischandrudu Abaddhamaadithe, the film stars Rajendra Prasad and Shobana while Mallikarjuna Rao, Rallapalli, Kallu Chidambaram, and Sakshi Ranga Rao play supporting roles. The film has music composed by Ilaiyaraaja.

The film received Nandi Award for Best Audiographer. It was remade in Tamil as Sathyavan, in Kannada as Mr. Harishchandra, and in Odia as Jabardast Premika.

Plot
Divakaram is a videographer from Rajahmundry who arrives in Vizianagaram to video-shoot a wedding. He sees Bhuvaneswari there and falls head over heels in love. By getting hold of her uncle Jagannatham, Divakaram learns that she respects only people who are self-sufficient and straightforward. He also finds out that she is unmarried and would soon be transferred to Rajahmundry as a part of her job. In order to impress her, Divakaram decides to open a video rental shop and appear as a well-settled man. He returns to Rajahmundry and gets permission from Dr. Krupa Mani, who raised him as her foster child, to use the front veranda in her house for his shop. In order to secure the capital, he uses all kinds of gimmicks. He blackmails Bhagyam, cheats Chinna Rao, and claims a chit which he never was a member of, and so on. Finally, Divakaram opens the video shop.

Divakaram's friend Gopichand has a sister who is cheated by the Circle Inspector's son. Furious Gopichand kills him during a football match, and covers it up as an accident. Divakaram unintentionally records the act of murder. He secretly burns the tape to get away with it. Meanwhile, Jagannatham has been writing him letters in Bhuvaneswari's name in the hope of favours. Divakaram assumes that she is in love with him. Bhuvaneswari arrives in the town with her mother and Jagannatham. Divakaram immediately proposes her marriage but realizes that he had been cheated by Jagannatham. Bhuvaneswari finds out all of Divakaram's mischief through his neighbours. To get rid of him, she puts forward a deal that she would marry him only if does not utter a lie in a month from then. Divakaram who finds it easy, goes for it. The deal is set to end on April 1.

Soon after, Divakaram causes a series of troubles as he could only tell truth. He keeps no secrets which puts all his neighbours at risk. As Divakaram is protected by Gopichand, the neighbours conspire to turn Gopichand against him. On the day before the deal ends, they set him up in such a way that he reveals all the truth about Gopichand's criminal activities. Gopichand is arrested, and later acquitted due to lack of evidence. As a revenge, he gets Divakaram arrested.

Bhuvaneswari gets Divakaram bail. Krupa Mani who now knows about the deal pleads Divakaram to give up but he refuses. Divakaram's assistant warns him that if Gopichand gets to know about the recording, his life would be at risk. This conversation is overheard by Gopichand's friend who tells him about the recording. Gopichand wows to kill Divakaram on that night, and announces that anyone who to turns Divakarm in will be rewarded. Krupa Mani informs the CI that his son is murdered by Gopichand who is about to kill Divakaram.

Divakaram is badly injured by Gopichand's men. Krupa Mani treats Divakaram at her house but Gopichand arrives there. To protect Divakaram, Krupa Rani kills Gopichand by stabbing him. Divakaram falsely admits to the police that he has killed Gopichand and gets arrested, thus losing the deal.

Impressed by the Divakaram's decision, Bhuvaneswari says he won her heart despite losing the deal. Krupa Mani confesses to the murder as an act of self-defense and Divakaram is released. He is free from the deal and is able to marry Bhuvaneswari.

Cast
 Rajendra Prasad as Divakaram:  He goes to any extent to get his things done. He loves Bhuvaneswari and wants to marry her. He is sincere in his love and comes what may determine to keep his words to prove his love. In this process, he suffers in the end for his earlier mischief. He was raised by Dr. Krupamani as her own son.
 Shobana as Bhuvaneswari:  She works as a Railway Booking Clerk. She is very straightforward and doesn't like anyone to go against the rules. She makes the deal with Divakaram to get rid of him, but finally falls in love with him seeing his sincerity.
 Krishna Bhagavan as Gopichand:  He is a friend of Divakaram. He kills his friend when he refuses to marry his sister after having an affair with her.
 Mallikarjuna Rao as Chinna Rao:  He is in love with Bhagyam, even though he is already married twice and he thinks he is a superstar and wants to marry her. In that process, he gets cheated by Divakaram.
 Rallapalli as Sharma
 Sakshi Ranga Rao as Murthy
 Pradeep Shakthi as V. P. Jaganatham, Bhuvaneswari's uncle
 Bheemaraju as Rama Murthy
 Kallu Chidambaram as Ragpicker
 Shubha as Dr. Krupamani, guardian of Divakaram
 Jayalalita as Bhagyam
 Jaya Vijaya as Bhuvaneswari's mother
 Y. Vijaya as Murthy's wife
 L.B. Sriram as Barber
The film was shot in one location in two weeks.

Soundtrack

Music was composed by Maestro Ilaiyaraaja. Music was released on ECHO Audio Company. The song "Chukkalu Temmanna" was reused from Raja's own song "Chithirai Sevvanam", which was composed for Kaatrinile Varum Geetham.

Reception 
K writing for Sakshi in February 2017, appreciated the writing of Vamsy and the performance of Rajendra Prasad. K noted the similarity between April 1 Vidudala and the American film Liar Liar (1997) which is also shares a similar plot point, where the protagonist who is habituated to lying starts speaking truth.

References

External links
 

1991 films
Films scored by Ilaiyaraaja
Telugu films remade in other languages
Indian romantic comedy-drama films
Indian comedy thriller films
Films directed by Vamsy
1990s Telugu-language films
1990s romantic comedy-drama films
1991 comedy-drama films
Films based on Indian novels